The 2001 Connecticut Huskies football team competed in the 2001 NCAA Division I-A football season as an independent. This was the program second second season as the NCAA Division I-A and its final as a transitional team. Led by Randy Edsall in his third year as head coach, Connecticut finished with season with a record of 2–9.

Schedule

References

Connecticut
UConn Huskies football seasons
Connecticut Huskies football